Megachile toluca is a species of bee within the family of Megachilidae. It was described by Cresson in 1878.

References

Toluca
Insects described in 1878